HAT-P-29, also known as Muspelheim since 2019 (as part of the IAU's NameExoWorlds project), is the primary of a binary star system about 1030 light-years away. It is a G-type main-sequence star. The star's age of 2.2 billion years is less than half that of the Sun. HAT-P-29 is slightly enriched in heavy elements, having 35% more iron than the Sun.

The very faint 19-magnitude stellar companion was detected in 2016 at a projected separation of 3.290″.

Planetary system
In 2011 a transiting hot Jupiter planet b was detected on a mildly eccentric orbit. The planet was named "Surt" by Denmark in 2019. The planetary orbit is likely aligned with the equatorial plane of the star, misalignment equal to 26 degrees.

In 2018, a transit-timing variation survey indicated additional planets with masses exceeding approximately half of Earth are absent in the system.

References

Perseus (constellation)
G-type main-sequence stars
Binary stars
Planetary systems with one confirmed planet
Planetary transit variables
J02123147+5146435